This page lists all described species of the spider family Xenoctenidae accepted by the World Spider Catalog :

Incasoctenus

Incasoctenus Mello-Leitão, 1942
 I. perplexus Mello-Leitão, 1942 (type) — Peru

Odo

Odo Keyserling, 1887
 O. abudi Alayón, 2002 — Hispaniola
 O. agilis Simon, 1897 — St. Thomas
 O. ariguanabo Alayón, 1995 — Cuba
 O. australiensis Hickman, 1944 — Central Australia
 O. blumenauensis Mello-Leitão, 1927 — Brazil
 O. bruchi (Mello-Leitão, 1938) — Argentina
 O. cubanus (Franganillo, 1946) — Cuba
 O. desenderi Baert, 2009 — Ecuador (Galapagos Is.)
 O. drescoi (Caporiacco, 1955) — Venezuela
 O. galapagoensis Banks, 1902 — Ecuador (Galapagos Is.)
 O. gigliolii Caporiacco, 1947 — Guyana
 O. incertus Caporiacco, 1955 — Venezuela
 O. insularis Banks, 1902 — Ecuador (Galapagos Is.)
 O. keyserlingi Kraus, 1955 — El Salvador
 O. lenis Keyserling, 1887 (type) — Nicaragua
 O. limitatus Gertsch & Davis, 1940 — Mexico
 O. lycosoides (Chamberlin, 1916) — Peru
 O. maelfaiti Baert, 2009 — Ecuador (Galapagos Is.)
 O. obscurus Mello-Leitão, 1936 — Brazil
 O. patricius Simon, 1900 — Peru, Chile
 O. pulcher Keyserling, 1891 — Brazil
 O. roseus (Mello-Leitão, 1941) — Argentina
 O. sericeus (Mello-Leitão, 1944) — Argentina
 O. serrimanus Mello-Leitão, 1936 — Brazil
 O. similis Keyserling, 1891 — Brazil
 O. tulum Alayón, 2003 — Mexico
 O. vittatus (Mello-Leitão, 1936) — Brazil

Paravulsor

Paravulsor Mello-Leitão, 1922
 P. impudicus Mello-Leitão, 1922 (type) — Brazil

Xenoctenus

Xenoctenus Mello-Leitão, 1938
 X. marmoratus Mello-Leitão, 1941 — Argentina
 X. pampeanus Mello-Leitão, 1940 — Argentina
 X. patagonicus Mello-Leitão, 1940 — Argentina
 X. unguiculatus Mello-Leitão, 1938 (type) — Argentina

References

Xenoctenidae